
Year 335 (CCCXXXV) was a common year starting on Wednesday (link will display the full calendar) of the Julian calendar. At the time, it was known as the Year of the Consulship of Constantius and Albinus (or, less frequently, year 1088 Ab urbe condita). The denomination 335 for this year has been used since the early medieval period, when the Anno Domini calendar era became the prevalent method in Europe for naming years.

Events 
 By place 
 Roman Empire 
 September 14 – Emperor Constantine I consecrates the Church of the Holy Sepulchre in Jerusalem.
 September 19 – Flavius Dalmatius is raised to the rank of Caesar, with control of Thracia and Macedonia.
 Hannibalianus, nephew of Constantine I, is made Rex Regum ("King of Kings of the Pontic people").
 November 7 – Athanasius is banished to Trier, on the charge that he prevented the corn fleet from sailing to Constantinople.

 Asia 
 Samudragupta succeeds Chandragupta I as king of the Gupta Empire.
 Tuoba Hena ousts Tuoba Yihuai as chieftain of the Tuoba Clan.
 Emperor Shi Hu moves the capital of the Later Zhao state to Yecheng.

 By topic 
 Religion 
 First Synod of Tyre: Constantine I convenes a gathering of bishops at Tyre to depose and exile Patriarch Athanasius of Alexandria.
 Constantine I reinstates the Alexandrian priest Arius (declared a heretic at the First Council of Nicaea in 325) in a synod at Jerusalem about a year before Arius' death.
 September 13 – The Church of the Holy Sepulchre in Jerusalem is consecrated.
 December 31 – Pope Sylvester I dies at Rome after a 21-year reign. He is succeeded by Mark as the 34th pope.

Births 
 Fu Sheng, Chinese emperor of the Di state Former Qin (d. 357)
 Gregory of Nyssa, Christian bishop and saint (approximate date)
 Magnus Maximus, Western Roman emperor (approximate date)
 Theon of Alexandria, director of the Library of Alexandria (approximate date)

Deaths 
 December 31 – Sylvester I, pope of the Catholic Church (b. 285)
 Chandragupta I, Indian king of the Gupta Empire
 Cheng, Chinese empress dowager of the Later Zhao state
 Lady Xun (or Yuzhang), Chinese concubine of Yuan of Jin

References